The European School of Management and Technology, also known as ESMT Berlin, is a private non-profit business school based in Berlin, Germany. The business school was founded in 2002 by 25 global companies and institutions including McKinsey & Company, Inc., KPMG, The Boston Consulting Group, Siemens and T-Mobile. ESMT offers a full-time MBA, an executive MBA, a part-time MBA, a global online MBA, a master in management, a master in global management, a master in innovation and entrepreneurship, a master in analytics and artificial intelligence program, as well as open enrollment and customized executive education programs.

ESMT Berlin is regarded as one of the most prestigious business schools in Europe, ranked 7th by the Financial Times and 12th by Bloomberg Businessweek. It is one of four business schools in Germany with triple accreditation from the European Quality Improvement System (EQUIS), the Association to Advance Collegiate Schools of Business (AACSB) and the Association of MBAs (AMBA).

History 

ESMT Berlin was founded in 2002 by 25 leading multinational firms. The school's expertise focuses on the development of responsible leaders with a global focus on innovative management, analytics, and technology and is a state-accredited university. ESMT has a satellite campus in Berlin-Schöneberg and a branch office in Shanghai. The school has more than 8,000 alumni in chapters located worldwide and around 3,500 executives and managers participate in the ESMT Executive Development Programmes each year.

The origins of the school lay in the founding companies wanting to break from the limited, German executive education which characterized the country's business schools and the desire for a style that was less American and more culturally complex. Former ESMT President, Lars-Hendrik Röller, noted in 2009 that the school is very interested in societal impact and students need to exhibit long-term, socially responsible leadership.

Programs 

ESMT Berlin offers a full-time MBA, an executive MBA, a part-time MBA, a global online MBA, a master in management, a master in global management, a master in innovation and entrepreneurship, a master in analytics and artificial intelligence program, and several executive education courses. It also has a Ph.D. program.

The full-time MBA is a 15 month, personalized program that starts in January each year. The MBA focuses on innovation, technology, managing big data, sustainable business development, entrepreneurship, and global strategic management. 

The Part-time Blended MBA in Business Innovation covers topics, such as customer centricity, entrepreneurial strategy and innovation, digital business, and agility. The program comprises 75% online MBA study and 25% in person over 14 weekends in either Berlin or Munich. 

The Berlin Global Online MBA is a 24-month program with the option to take up to five years to complete it at the student’s own pace. It targets professionals working full-time while providing the opportunity to gain knowledge, specifically on Analytics, Innovation and Leadership. Students choose add-ons to the scheduled courses, adding in personalized career coaching, or taking a global module either in Berlin, or a global week international field study. 

The Executive MBA integrates academic training with an Individual Leadership Development Itinerary, peer-to-peer and individual coaching, applied and evidence-based learning. All combine to give executives the knowledge and experience necessary to grow an organization with the sensitivity needed to manage and develop people effectively. 

The Master in Global Management lasts for 24 months and is designed to prepare students to employ theoretical knowledge developed in undergraduate work in an applied business or management setting. ESMT uses an integrative approach combining modern methods and theories with practice immersion – all with a global outlook.

The Master in Innovation & Entrepreneurship is a 2 year program starting in September every year. The specialized curriculum is designed to help students identify the challenges and opportunities in today’s dynamic networked society, and to react to them by implementing business solutions. The curriculum focuses on innovation and entrepreneurial skills whilst at the same time supporting students on their personal innovation and creation journey.

The new Master in Analytics & Artificial Intelligence is a 2 year program starting in September every year. Students learn to work with both quantitative skills and managerial vision to better understand how to create value through data driven solutions. Courses include Machine Learning Basics, Data Scraping & Processing, Predictive Analysis, and Risk Modeling. Students also take part in a targeted internship and additional finance courses.

Accreditation 
ESMT Berlin is accredited by Association of MBAs (AMBA), Association to Advance Collegiate Schools of Business (AACSB), European Quality Improvement System (EQUIS), and Foundation for International Business Administration Accreditation (FIBAA). It is only one of four business schools in Germany with triple accreditation.

Rankings

Rankings 

European Business Schools 
Financial Times European Business School Rankings 2022: 8, #1 in Germany

MBA 
Financial Times Global MBA Ranking 2022: 88
America Economia Global MBA Ranking 2021: 24
The Economist "Which MBA?" Ranking 2022: 74

Executive MBA
The Economist Which MBA? Executive MBA Ranking 2020: 20
Financial Times Executive MBA Ranking 2022: 43

Master in Global Management
The Economist Masters in Management Ranking 2021: 14
Financial Times Global Ranking 2022: 10, #1 in Germany

Executive Education
Financial Times Executive Education The top 30 schools worldwide 2022: 11
Financial Times Executive Education Open 2022: 14
Financial Times Executive Education Customized 2022: 10

Campuses

Berlin 

The school's headquarters and main campus is located in the former GDR State Council Building in Berlin next to the Federal Foreign Office and opposite of the UNESCO world cultural heritage Museum Island. Constructed in 1960s' socialist architectural style to host the Staatsrat (State Council) of the GDR, it represented the supreme institution of the East German state governance. From 2004 to 2005 the building underwent an extensive renovation supervised by the German architect HG Merz. The main foyer is accessible to the public and guided tours are available.

From 1999 to 2001 the building served as the Federal Chancellery (Berlin) under former German Chancellor Gerhard Schröder. Since its renovation, it has acted as a venue for seminars, lectures, conferences, and social events for academic institutions, government agencies, as well as groups and companies. The building received further improvements in 2017, with the remodelling of the third floor conducted to accommodate the significant increase in the number of students. This led to the creation of the new library, four seminar rooms, the ESMT research lab, eleven group study rooms and a student lounge.

Cologne 

The school's former Cologne campus, Schloss Gracht, is a historic castle and grounds where the Metternich family lived for centuries. From 1968 it was the home of the Universitätsseminar der Wirtschaft (USW) which offered executive education courses. USW was later integrated into ESMT Berlin and became the site of ESMT's German-language executive education courses. After successfully integrating the courses into the main campus of ESMT in Berlin, Schloss Gracht was sold as of November 30, 2018. It will be converted into a stress and sports medicine centre.

Partnerships and cooperations

ESMT is a member of the Global Network for Advanced Management, a collaboration of graduate schools of business that seeks to foster intellectual ties among business schools, students and deans from both economically strong regions and those on the horizon of economic development. Partner institutions in this network include Yale University, University of California, Berkeley, University of Oxford, University of New South Wales, HEC Paris, IIM Bangalore, University of British Columbia, National University of Singapore among others.

ESMT is a part of the Global MiM Network in association with Imperial College London, Singapore Management University and Queen's University at Kingston which enables students at each member school to take courses at one or more partner institutions, providing a more global study experience without the bureaucracy or the cost of a full-time overseas program.

ESMT has national partnerships with Humboldt University, Free University Berlin, Technical University of Berlin, Hasso Plattner Institute as well as more institutions. ESMT is a member of the MBA alliance, comprising the top 5 business schools in Germany with Mannheim Business School, Frankfurt School of Finance & Management, HHL Leipzig Graduate School of Management and WHU – Otto Beisheim School of Management.

Centers and chairs 

Centers
 Center for Financial Reporting and Auditing (CFRA)
 Center for Leadership Development Research (CLDR)
 Center for Sustainable Business and Leadership (CSBL)
 Digital Society Institute (DSI)
 Hidden Champions Institute (HCI)
 Institute for Endowment Management and Entrepreneurial Finance (IFEE)

Chairs
 Deutsche Bank Professor in Sustainable Finance
 Deutsche Post DHL Chair in Sustainable Accounting
 Deutsche Telekom Chair in Leadership and HR Development
 ESMT Chair in Entrepreneurship
 Ingrid and Manfred Gentz Chair in Business and Society
 Joachim Faber Chair in Business and Technology
 Lufthansa Group Chair in Innovation
 Michael Diekmann Chair in Management Science
 President's Chair
 Volkswagen Group Junior Chair for Diversity in Organizations

Organisational structure 

The main governance structures are the Executive Management Committee, chaired by Jörg Rocholl, PhD, President and Managing Director of ESMT Berlin and the Supervisory Board of ESMT GmbH chaired by Werner Zedelius, Senior Advisor, Allianz SE.

Founders 

The school's founders include: 
 Airbus
 Allianz SE
 Axel Springer AG
 Bayer AG
 Bayerische Hypo- und Vereinsbank AG
 Bayerische Motoren Werke AG
 Confederation of German Employers' Associations (Bundesvereinigung der Deutschen Arbeitgeberverbände, BDA) e.V.
 Daimler AG
 Deutsche Bank AG
 Deutsche Lufthansa AG
 Deutsche Post AG
 Deutsche Telekom AG
 Association of German Chambers of Industry and Commerce
 E.ON AG
 Bundesverband der Deutschen Industrie
 innogy SE
 KPMG AG Wirtschaftsprüfungsgesellschaft
 MAN SE
 McKinsey & Company, Inc.
 Münchener Rückversicherungs-Gesellschaft AG
 Robert Bosch GmbH
 SAP SE
 Siemens AG
 The Boston Consulting Group
 ThyssenKrupp

References

External links 
 
 

 
Business schools in Germany
Universities and colleges in Berlin
Educational institutions established in 2002
2002 establishments in Germany